Lidón Muñoz (born 3 December 1995) is a Spanish swimmer. She competed in the women's 50 metre freestyle at the 2019 World Aquatics Championships held in Gwangju, South Korea.

References

External links
 

1995 births
Living people
Spanish female freestyle swimmers
Sportspeople from Castellón de la Plana
Swimmers at the 2013 Mediterranean Games
Swimmers at the 2018 Mediterranean Games
Swimmers at the 2022 Mediterranean Games
Mediterranean Games gold medalists for Spain
Mediterranean Games silver medalists for Spain
Mediterranean Games bronze medalists for Spain
Mediterranean Games medalists in swimming
Swimmers at the 2020 Summer Olympics
Olympic swimmers of Spain
20th-century Spanish women
21st-century Spanish women